Italian Ethiopia, also known as the Italian Empire of Ethiopia, was the territory of the Ethiopian Empire which was occupied by Italy for approximately five years. Italian Ethiopia was not an administrative entity, but the formal name of the former territory of the Ethiopian Empire which now constituted the Governorates of Amhara, Harar, Galla-Sidamo, and Scioa after the establishment of Italian East Africa (Africa Orientale Italiana, AOI).

After the Second Italo-Ethiopian War, in which Ethiopia was occupied by Fascist Italy, the Ethiopian territories were proclaimed by Benito Mussolini as part of Italian East Africa (AOI) in 1936, with the capital of the AOI being established in Addis Ababa and King Victor Emmanuel III of Italy proclaiming himself Emperor of Ethiopia. Fighting between Ethiopian and Italian regular forces continued until February 1937, and afterward guerrilla fighting persisted until 1939.
	
In 1941, during World War II, Ethiopia was occupied by Allied forces, mainly from the British Empire, in the East African Campaign, but an Italian guerrilla war continued until 1943. The country was placed under British military administration; Emperor Haile Selassie was allowed to return and claim his throne, but the British authorities ruled the country until December 1944, when full sovereignty was restored with the signing of an Anglo-Ethiopian Agreement, although some regions remained under British control for more years. Under the peace treaty of 1947, Italy recognized the sovereignty and independence of Ethiopia and renounced all claims to special interests or influence in that country. Many Italian settlers remained for decades after receiving full pardon by Emperor Selassie.

Characteristics

Since 1 June 1936 Italian Ethiopia was part of the newly created Italian East Africa, and was administratively composed of four governorates: Amhara, Harar, Galla-Sidamo and Scioa. The Scioa Governorate was originally known as the Addis Abeba Governorate, but enlarged in November 1938 with parts of the neighboring governorates of Harar, Galla-Sidamo, and Amhara. Each Governorate was under the authority of an Italian governor, answerable to the Italian viceroy, who represented the Emperor Victor Emmanuel III.

Some territories of the defeated Kingdom of Ethiopia were added to Italian Eritrea and Italian Somalia inside the AOI. This was not just since they were mainly populated by Eritreans and Somalis respectively, but also as a reward for their colonial soldiers who fought in the Italian Army against the Negus troops).

The currency used was the Italian East African lira: the Lira AOI were special banknotes of 50 lire and 100 lire circulating in AOI between 1938  and 1941:

History

Conquest and occupation

Emperor Haile Selassie's reign was interrupted on 3 October 1935 when Italian forces, under the direction of dictator Benito Mussolini, invaded and occupied Ethiopia. They occupied the capital, Addis Ababa, on 5 May 1936. Emperor Haile Selassie pleaded to the League of Nations for aid in resisting the Italians. Nevertheless, the country was formally occupied on 9 May 1936 and the Emperor went into exile. The war was full of cruelty. Italian troops used mustard gas in aerial bombardments (in violation of the Geneva Conventions) against combatants and civilians in an attempt to discourage the Ethiopian people from supporting the resistance. Deliberate Italian attacks against ambulances and hospitals of the Red Cross were reported. By all estimates, hundreds of thousands of Ethiopian civilians died as a result of the Italian invasion, including during the reprisal Yekatit 12 massacre in Addis Ababa, in which as many as 30,000 civilians were killed. These Italian reprisals against Ethiopian civilians have been described by some historians as constituting genocide. Crimes by Ethiopian troops included the use of Dum-Dum bullets (in violation of the Hague Conventions), the killing of civilian workmen (including during the Gondrand massacre) and the mutilation of captured Eritrean Ascari and Italians (often with castration), beginning in the first weeks of war.

Marshal Rodolfo Graziani, who replaced Marshal Badoglio as viceroy of Italian East Africa in May 1936 was short-tempered and inclined to violence and atrocities multiplied under his administration. Following a failed attack against Addis Ababa by rebels on 28 July 1936, he had the archbishop of Dessie, whom he suspected of being behind the attack shot the same afternoon. All resisting Ethiopians were declared "bandits" and he ordered that they be shot on capture. Mussolini approved the decision but requested that the order be kept secret. Following the defeat of rebels led by Ras Desta in the western part of the country in late December 1936, he had 1,600 rebel troops who surrendered summarily executed by firing squads. Villages that had been friendly to Desta were burned to the ground and women and children shot. Desta and other captured rebel leaders were executed in February 1937.

The Italians undertook many other terrorist actions during this period. Following a bloody attempt on the life of Graziani and other Italian officials by two Eritreans during a ceremony to celebrate the birth of the Prince of Naples on 19 February 1937, the police and soldiers, fearing a general uprising, fired indiscriminately into the crowd. Innocent bystanders were shot. For the next three days, the Italians, led by the Blackshirts, went on a rampage of murder and destruction throughout Addis Ababa. By the end of 1937 more than 5,000 people had been executed for alleged crimes related to the attempt against Graziani, and a total of 19,200 to 30,000 civilians were killed. Among the dead were virtually all the young educated Ethiopians the Italians could lay their hands on and all the officers and cadets of the Holeta Military Academy. The Italian viceroy had hermits, soothsayers and travelling minstrels rounded up and executed. Convinced that the high clergy had known about the plot, he had many executed. In May 1937, he ordered 297 monks of the monastery of Debre Libanos and 23 other individuals suspected of complicity shot. Over 100 deacons and students were also executed. Several hundred monks were sent to concentration camps. Viceroy Graziani was finally replaced in November 1938 by the more humane Duke of Aosta, who put an end to wanton atrocities which had had the effect of increasing resistance to Italian domination.

While some countries recognized the Italian conquest, Britain, France, the United States, the Soviet Union, China and the League of Nations refused formally to recognize it and consequently it remained illegitimate in international law. The King of Italy (Victor Emmanuel III) was crowned Emperor of Ethiopia and the Italians created an Italian empire in Africa (Italian East Africa) with Ethiopia, Eritrea and Italian Somalia. In 1937 Mussolini boasted that, with his conquest of Ethiopia, "finally Adua was avenged".

The Italians decreed miscegenation to be illegal. Racial separation, including residential segregation, was enforced as thoroughly as possible and the Italians showed favouritism to non-Christian groups. To isolate the dominant Amhara rulers of Ethiopia, who supported Selassie, the Italians granted the Oromos, the Somalis and other Muslims, many of whom had supported the invasion, autonomy and rights.

There was substantial investment in Ethiopian infrastructure development, with the budget for AOI from 1936 to 1937 requiring 19,136 billion lire when the annual revenue of Italy was only 18,581 billion lire. This infrastructure development was part of a plan to bring half a million Italians to colonize the Ethiopian plateaus. In October 1939 the Italian colonists in Ethiopia were 35,441, of whom 30,232 male (85.3%) and 5,209 female (14.7%), most of them living in urban areas. Only 3,200 Italian farmers moved to colonize farm areas, mostly around the capital and in the Scioa Governorate, where they were under sporadic attack by pro-Haile Selassie guerrillas through 1939.

The Italians created the "imperial road" between Addis Ababa and Massaua, the Addis Ababa – Mogadishu and the Addis Ababa – Assab. the Italians built more than 4,500 km of roads linking the country beyond 900 km of railways were reconstructed or initiated (like the railway between Addis Ababa and Assab), dams and hydroelectric plants were built, and many public and private companies were established in the underdeveloped country. The most important were: "Compagnie per il cotone d'Etiopia" (Cotton industry); "Cementerie d'Etiopia" (Cement industry); "Compagnia etiopica mineraria" (Minerals industry); "Imprese elettriche d'Etiopia" (Electricity industry); "Compagnia etiopica degli esplosivi" (Armament industry); "Trasporti automobilistici (Citao)" (Mechanic & Transport industry).
  

Italians also created new airports and in 1936 started the worldwide famous Linea dell'Impero, a flight connecting Addis Ababa to Rome. The line was opened after the Italian conquest of Ethiopia and was followed by the first air links with the Italian colonies in Italian East Africa, which began in a pioneering way since 1934. The route was enlarged to 6,379 km and initially joined Rome with Addis Ababa via Syracuse, Benghazi, Cairo, Wadi Halfa, Khartoum, Kassala, Asmara, Dire Dawa. There was a change of aircraft in Benghazi (or sometimes in Tripoli). The route was carried out in three and a half days of daytime flight and the frequency was four flights per week in both directions. Later from Addis Ababa there were three flights a week that continued to Mogadishu, capital of Italian Somalia.
 
The most important railway line in the African colonies of the Kingdom of Italy, the 784 km long Franco-Ethiopian Railway, was seized following the conquest of Ethiopia in 1936. The route was served until 1935 by steam trains that took about 36 hours to do the total trip between the capital of Ethiopia and the port of Djibouti. Following the Italian conquest was obtained in 1938 the increase of speed for the trains with the introduction of four railcars high capacity "type 038" derived from the model Fiat ALn56.
 
These diesel trains were able to reach 70 km/h and cutting time travel in half to just 18 hours: they were used until the mid-1960s. At the main stations there were some bus connections to the other cities of Italian Ethiopia not served by the railway. Additionally, a special fire-control unit was created near the Addis Ababa station, which was the first one in Africa. Through 1938 trains carried protective military units because of ongoing Ethiopian guerrilla activity.

Shifta (Ethiopian guerrillas) were still in control of nearly a quarter of the Ethiopian highlands through late 1939. By the eve of World War II they were still in control of Harar and the Galla-Sidamo Governorate. Abebe Aregai, the last leader of the "Arbegnochs" (as the guerrilla fighters were called in Ethiopia) made a surrender proposal to the Italians in spring 1940 after the 1939 surrender of Ethiopian leaders Zaudiè Asfau and Olonà Dinkel. During the five years of Italian occupation, Catholicism also grew in importance, thanks mainly to the efforts of missionaries like Elisa Angela Meneguzzi. She became known as the "Ecumenical Fire" due to her strong efforts at ecumenism with Coptic Christians and Muslims while also catering to relations with the Catholics of Dire Dawa.

World War II
During World War II, in the summer of 1940 Italian armed forces completed the Italian conquest of British Somaliland. By the spring of 1941, the British had counter-attacked and pushed deep into Italian East Africa. By 5 May, Haile Selassie had returned to Addis Ababa to reclaim his throne. In November, the last organised Italian resistance in Ethiopia ended with the fall of Gondar. Following the surrender of East Africa, some Italians conducted a guerrilla war which lasted for two more years.

This guerrilla action was done primarily by military units with Italian officers (like Captain Paolo Aloisi, Captain Leopoldo Rizzo, Blackshirt officer De Varda and Major Lucchetti) but also by civilians like Rosa Dainelli. She was a doctor who in August 1942 succeeded in entering the main ammunition depot of the British army in Addis Ababa, and blowing it up, miraculously survived the huge explosion. Her sabotage destroyed the ammunition for the new British Sten sub machine gun, delaying the use of this "state of the art" armament for many months. Her true name was Danielli Rosa and the date of attack was 15 September 1941.

After World War II

The recognition by the United Kingdom of the full sovereignty of Ethiopia occurred with the signing on 19 December 1944 of the Anglo-Ethiopian agreement which acknowledged Ethiopia to be "a free and independent state" although various regions remained under British occupation for some years.

In the peace treaty of February 1947, Italy renounced sovereignty over its African colonies of Libya, Eritrea and Somalia (art. 23) and recognised the independence of Ethiopia (art. 33), by then a sovereign member of the United Nations.

Italy further agreed to:
 Pay War reparation of US$25,000,000 to Ethiopia
 Accept "Annex XI of the Treaty", upon the recommendation of the United Nations General Assembly in Resolution 390, that indicated that Eritrea was to be federated with Ethiopia.

After the war, the Italian Ethiopians were given a full pardon by the newly returned Emperor Haile Selassie, as he saw the opportunity to continue the modernization efforts of the country. He declared that no reprisals would be taken against the Italians, and many remained for decades, until the overthrow of the Emperor in the Ethiopian Civil War in 1974. Nearly 22,000 Italo-Ethiopians took refuge in Italy during the 1970s. Their main organization in Italy is the Associazione Italiana Profughi dall'Etiopia ed Eritrea (A.I.P.E.E.).

In recent years, some Italian companies have returned to operate in Ethiopia, and a large number of Italian technicians and managers arrived with their families, residing mainly in the metropolitan area of the capital.

Contemporary relations

In the mid-1990s, a populist movement made up of Italians and Ethiopians (both in country and expatriates around the world) began to petition the then-current Italian government to return the obelisk, an event which eventually culminated in its repatriation in 2008 to Axum, the city of its creation.

The Italian firm Salini Costruttori was chosen by the Ethiopian government to design and build the Millennium or Renaissance Dam on the Blue Nile river, which when completed will be the largest dam and hydroelectric plant in Africa. As the Italian engineers had helped to build the first railway from Addis Ababa to Djibouti in the past, the Ethiopian government has contracted them again to expand the railroad network along with India and China. For the last 20 years, Italy has continued to be among the top 5 trading partners with Ethiopia and a major investor in the Ethiopian economy.

Ethiopian languages such as Amharic and Tigrinya have many words borrowed from the Italian language, for example "gettone" (token), "bigli" from Italian "biglie" (glass marbles), "borsa" (bag), "machìna" from Italian "macchina" (car), "carburatore" (carburetor) and others. Ethiopia has Italian schools and cultural institutes (such as the Scuola Statale Italiana of Addis Ababa), which foster and promote Italian and Ethiopian culture and are free to the public.

Banknotes and postage stamps

On 5 May 1936 the capital Addis Ababa was captured by the Italians: on 22 May three new stamps showing the King of Italy were issued. Four further values inscribed "ETIOPIA" were issued on 5 December 1936. After that date, the stamps were issued with the name "Africa Orientale Italiana" on it.

See also
 
 Italians of Ethiopia
 Italian Eritrea
 Italian Somalia
 Linea dell'Impero
 Prince Amedeo, Duke of Aosta

Notes

Footnotes

Bibliography
 
 
 
 
 
 
 
 

Ethiopia
Ethiopia
History of Ethiopia
1930s in Ethiopia
1940s in Ethiopia
1930s in Italy
1940s in Italy
Ethiopia–Italy relations
1936 establishments in Ethiopia
1947 disestablishments in Africa
1936 establishments in Italy
1947 disestablishments in Italy
States and territories established in 1936
States and territories disestablished in 1947